Isus may refer to:
Isus (mythology), a son of Priam, killed by Agamemnon, in Greek mythology
Isus (Boeotia), a town of ancient Boeotia
Isus (Megaris), a town of ancient Megaris

See also
Issus (disambiguation)
Isis, an Egyptian goddess